Louisiana Highway 43 (LA 43) is a state highway located in southeastern Louisiana.  It runs  in a north–south direction from LA 42 west of Springfield to the Mississippi state line north of Easleyville, where it continues as Mississippi Highway 568 (MS 568).

A primarily rural route, LA 43 connects four small municipalities in Livingston and St. Helena parishes, including Springfield, Albany, Montpelier, and Greensburg.  The latter is also the seat of St. Helena Parish.

Over the course of its route, LA 43 intersects such east–west routes as I-12, U.S. Highway 190 (US 190), LA 40, LA 16, LA 10, and LA 38, all of which connect to I-55.

LA 43 was designated in the 1955 Louisiana Highway renumbering from portions of former State Route 46 and State Route 37.

Route description

Livingston Parish
From the south, LA 43 begins at a junction with LA 42 just outside the Livingston Parish town of Springfield.  The route heads north through an area known as Hungarian Settlement and passes through an interchange with I-12 at exit 32, connecting with the cities of Hammond and Baton Rouge.  Immediately north of I-12 is an intersection with LA 1040 (Old Baton Rouge Highway), an older alignment of US 190.  LA 43 enters the village of Albany and becomes known as Montpelier Road.  In the center of town, LA 43 intersects US 190 (Florida Boulevard), which serves local traffic along the I-12 corridor.  Immediately north of this junction, LA 43 crosses the Canadian National Railway (CN) line at grade.

North of Albany, LA 43 travels between the Tickfaw River and Little Natalbany River toward the St. Helena Parish village of Montpelier.  During this stretch are junctions with LA 1064, LA 442, and LA 40, connecting to the Tangipahoa Parish communities of Natalbany, Tickfaw, and Independence, respectively.

St. Helena Parish
About  after crossing into St. Helena Parish, LA 43 turns west at a four-way intersection to run concurrent with westbound LA 16 and southbound LA 441 across the Tickfaw River into Montpelier.  After following 4th Street into town, LA 43 makes a turn opposite Durbin Road to resume its northern course.   later, LA 43 intersects LA 1045, which parallels LA 16 toward Amite City.

 later, LA 43 enters the town of Greensburg, the parish seat.  Traveling along Sitman Street, the route passes the parish school board and clerk of court buildings.  It then makes a one-block jog west via LA 10 (North Main Street) and north again onto Kendrick Street, where it passes the parish sheriff's office and hospital complexes.

LA 43 reaches its northern terminus at the Mississippi state line southwest of Gillsburg. The roadway crosses into Amite County and continues as Mississippi Highway 568 (MS 568) toward Magnolia, Mississippi.

Route classification and data
LA 43 is classified by the Louisiana Department of Transportation and Development (La DOTD) as an urban collector from its southern terminus through Albany and as a rural major collector otherwise.  Daily traffic volume in 2013 peaked at 12,300 vehicles in Albany with the remainder of the route averaging less than half that number.  The lowest figures were reported near the Mississippi state line with an average of 640 vehicles daily.  The posted speed limit is generally  in rural areas, reduced to  through town.  LA 43 is an undivided two-lane highway for its entire length.

History
In the original Louisiana Highway system in use between 1921 and 1955, the majority of LA 43 was part of State Route 46.  Route 46 also encompassed the modern LA 429 from Dutchtown to St. Amant; LA 431 from St. Amant to Port Vincent; and LA 42 from Port Vincent to Springfield.  Between Greensburg and the Mississippi state line, what is now LA 43 was formerly an extension of State Route 37, which kept its number in the 1955 Louisiana Highway renumbering but gave up this portion of the route.

LA 43 was created in the 1955 renumbering, giving a dedicated route number to the north–south corridor in Livingston and St. Helena parishes west of US 51.  The route has remained virtually unchanged to the present day.

Major intersections

See also

References

External links

Maps / GIS Data Homepage, Louisiana Department of Transportation and Development

0043
Transportation in Livingston Parish, Louisiana
Transportation in St. Helena Parish, Louisiana